Sub Rosa is the third studio album by Swedish singer-songwriter Eagle-Eye Cherry, released in September 2003 by Polydor Records. It reached the top 40 on the Swedish and Swiss charts. The song "Don't Give Up" was featured in the Disney film Holes.

Track listing

Charts

References

External links
 Sub Rosa at Discogs

2003 albums
Eagle-Eye Cherry albums
Albums produced by Klas Åhlund
albums produced by Cameron McVey
albums produced by Tim Simenon
Polydor Records albums